Asier Gomes Álvarez (born 1 January 1998) is a Spanish footballer who plays for UP Langreo as a midfielder.

Club career
Gomes was born in Oviedo, Asturias, and represented Fútbol Centro Asturiano Oviedo and Real Oviedo as a youth. He made his senior debut with the reserves in the 2016–17 campaign, in Tercera División.

Gomes made his first team debut on 6 September 2017, starting in a 0–1 home loss against CD Numancia, for the season's Copa del Rey. The following 24 August, he moved to another reserve team, Racing de Santander B also in the fourth division.

References

External links

1998 births
Living people
People from Oviedo
Spanish footballers
Footballers from Asturias
Association football midfielders
Tercera División players
Real Oviedo Vetusta players
Real Oviedo players
Rayo Cantabria players
UP Langreo footballers
Spain youth international footballers